SuperStar (previously known as Česko Slovenská SuperStar) is a joint Czech-Slovak version of the Idol series' Pop Idol. It was merged from Česko hledá SuperStar and SuperStar Search Slovakia, which previously had three individual seasons each.
The first season premiered in September 2009 with castings held in Prague, Brno, Bratislava and Košice. It is broadcast on two channels: «TV Nova» (Czech Republic) and «Markíza» (Slovakia) which have also been the broadcast stations for the individual seasons. Also both hosts have been their hosts countries before as have been three out of the four judges.
To legitimate a fair chance for each country's contestants to reach the final, twelve of the contestants will compete split into genders and nationalities in the semifinals, guaranteeing a 50% share for each country in the top 12.

Cast

Hosts 

Key
 Host of SuperStar

Judges 

Key
 Judges of SuperStar

Series overview
Color key

Season 1 

The first series ran from September to December 2009. Twelve contestants made it to the finals. TOP 12 consisted of 3 Slovak boys, 3 Czech boys, 3 Slovak girls and 3 Czech girls. The first single recorded by TOP 12 is called "Příběh Nekončí / Príbeh Nekončí" (The Story Doesn't End) and it was composed by judge Pavol Habera (music) and Slovak poet Daniel Hevier. Every final night had a different theme. The audience could vote for contestants from the very beginning of the show, voting ended during the result show the following day. There were double eliminations in first two final rounds, with only one contestant being eliminated once the candidates became the TOP 8. All gender and nationality quotas are abolished in the finals.

Season 2 

The second series ran from February until June in 2011. Twelve contestants made it to the finals. TOP 12 consisted of 3 Slovak boys, 3 Czech boys, 3 Slovak girls and 3 Czech girls. The first single recorded by TOP 12 is called "Nevzdávám" (Ain't Giving Up) and it was composed by judge Pavol Habera (music) and Slovak poet Daniel Hevier. Every final night had a different theme. The audience could vote for contestants from the very beginning of the show, voting ended during the result show the following day. There were double eliminations in first two final rounds, with only one contestant being eliminated once the candidates became the TOP 8. All gender and nationality quotas are abolished in the finals.

Season 3 

The third series, which ran from February until June in 2013, was broadcast on Czech TV Nova and Slovak TV Markíza. The Judges were Czech/Polish singer Ewa Farna, Ondřej Soukup and Slovak singer Paľo Habera. The presenters were Zorka Kepková and Roman Juraško. Twelve contestants made it to the finals. TOP 12 consisted of 2 Slovak boys, 4 Czech boys, 3 Slovak girls and 3 Czech girls. The first single recorded by TOP 12 is called "Při tobě stát / Pri tebe stáť" (To stand for you). Every final night had a different theme. The audience could vote for contestants from the very beginning of the show, voting ended during the result show the same day.

Season 4 

The fourth series was broadcast on Czech TV Nova and Slovak TV Markíza between August and December, 2015. The Judges were Ondřej Soukup, Marta Jandová, Klára Vytisková and Paľo Habera. The presenter was Martin "Pyco" Rausch. Eight contestants made it to the finals. TOP 8 consisted of 1 Slovak boy, 3 Czech boys, 3 Slovak girls and 1 Czech girl. The first single recorded by TOP 8 is cover version of Česko Slovenská SuperStar 2009 theme song "Príbeh nekončí" (The Story Doesn't End). Every final night had a different theme. The audience could vote for contestants from the very beginning of the show, voting ended during the result show the same day.

Season 5 

The fifth season began in February on Czech TV Nova and Slovak TV Markíza. Paľo Habera remains as the judge, three new judges are Ben Cristovao, Katarína Knechtová and Matěj Ruppert. The presenters are Jasmína Alagič and Leoš Mareš (since Live shows).  TOP 10 consists of 3 Slovak boys, 1 Czech boy, 1 Filipino boy, 2 Slovak girls and 3 Czech girl. Every final night has its theme. Audience can vote for contestants from the very beginning of the show, voting ends during result show on the same day.

Season 6 

The sixth season started in the beginning of 2020 on Czech TV Nova and Slovak TV Markíza once again. This was the first season with 5 judges - Paľo Habera remains on the panel while he will be joined by Leoš Mareš, one of the former hosts of the show as well as Monika Bagárová, season 1 finalist who finished at 5th place. Remaining two seats on the panel will be taken by Marián Čekovský and Patricie Pagáčová. Final shows will be filmed live in Studio Jinonice in Prague. Contestant and production members from Slovakia were tested for COVID-19 before they crossed borders of Czech Republic and after return they will take quarantine. Contesntat from Czech Republic were tested in Czech Republic and Diana Kovaľová who lives in Spain was tested in Spain. Also judge Pavol Habera was tested in USA where he was during last weeks.

Season 7 

The seventh season started in autumn 2021 on Czech TV Nova and Slovak TV Markíza once again. All judges from last season returned for the first time in history of the show - Paľo Habera, Leoš Mareš, Monika Bagárová, Marián Čekovský and Patricie Pagáčová. After one season without host, this role is returned and all live shows are hosted by singer and former judge from season 3 Ewa Farná. TOP 10 consists of 2 Slovak boys, 4 Czech boys, 2 Slovak girls and 2 Czech girl. Every final night has its theme. Audience can vote for contestants from the very beginning of the show, voting ends during result show on the same day.

Receptions

Ratings

See also 
Česko Slovenská SuperStar: Výběr finálových hitů
X Factor (Czech Republic)
 The 100 Greatest Slovak Albums of All Time

References

External links 
Official Czech homepage hosted by Nova
Official Slovak homepage hosted by Markíza

 
2009 Czech television series debuts
TV Nova (Czech TV channel) original programming
Markíza original programming
2009 Slovak television series debuts
Czech reality television series
Slovak reality television series
Czech music television series
Slovak music television series
Czech television series based on British television series
Slovak television series based on British television series